Röbel is a municipality  in the Mecklenburgische Seenplatte district, in Mecklenburg-Western Pomerania, Germany. It is situated on the western shore of Lake Müritz, 25 km north of Wittstock, and 27 km southwest of Waren. It is part of the Amt Röbel-Müritz.

Sights
The museum Engelscher Hof and the half-timbered former synagogue provide a permanent exhibition on Mecklenburg's Jewish history, commemorating among other things the life and work of Israel Jacobson, formerly consistorial president in the Kingdom of Westphalia and feudal landlord in Jördenstorf.

Notable people

 Franz Engel (1834–1920), ethnologist, biologist, and research traveler
 Gustav Melkert (1890–1943), secretary of the agricultural workers' union in the then district of Müritz and member of the SPD. Used as a Nazi resister. A street in the district of Gildekamp is named after him.
 Julius Runge (1843–1922), painter
 Grit Breuer (born 1972), athlete
 Otto Strack (1856-1935), architect who worked in Chicago, Milwaukee and New York City. Designed Pabst Hotel in New York. Noted for using steel beams in theaters and early sky scrapers.

References

External links

Cities and towns in Mecklenburg
Populated places established in the 13th century
1260s establishments in the Holy Roman Empire
1261 establishments in Europe
Grand Duchy of Mecklenburg-Schwerin